A list of films produced by the Marathi language film industry based in Maharashtra in the year 1930.

1930 Releases
A list of Marathi films released in 1930.

References

External links
Gomolo - 

Lists of 1930 films by country or language
1930
1930 in Indian cinema